The 2018-19 Bangladesh Championship League was 7th season of the Bangladesh Championship League since its establishment in 2012. A total of 11 teams will compete in the league.  The season started on 10 February 2019 and ended on 24 May 2019.

Venue
All matches were held at the BSSS Mostafa Kamal Stadium in Dhaka, Bangladesh.

League table

Season statistics

Hat-tricks

References

Bangladesh Championship League seasons
2018–19 in Asian second tier association football leagues
2018 in Bangladeshi football
2019 in Bangladeshi football